Minnesota Wing, Civil Air Patrol (MNWG) is one of 52 Wings (50 states, Puerto Rico, and Washington, D.C.) of Civil Air Patrol (the official United States Air Force Auxiliary) and  helps fulfill Civil Air Patrol's core missions in Aerospace Education, Cadet Programs, and Emergency Services.

Minnesota Wing is headquartered in Inver Grove Heights, Minnesota.  The Wing is divided into four Groups.  Each Group is, in turn, made up of 4 to 7 Squadrons.  Minnesota Wing currently has 23 squadrons located throughout the state.

Aerospace Education 
MNWG has been recognized nationally by National Headquarters CAP for outstanding performance with the Aerospace Education program.

The week-long North Central Region flight academy is held each summer in Mankato, Minnesota.  Cadets have the option of attending a course focused on powered flight, or one focused on glider flight.  In either school, cadets have the opportunity to log up to 20 hours of flight time, as well as solo should they demonstrate proficiency.

Cadet Programs 
Most squadrons in MNWG include cadets (as either a Composite Squadron or a Cadet Squadron).  North Hennepin Squadron in Crystal, Minnesota holds the distinction as being the first squadron in the nation to have a cadet program. Currently, there are 662 cadets in the Wing.  

Minnesota holds an annual Encampment at Camp Ripley.  Encampment is a 7- to 10-day cadet training activity that typically consists of between 80-100 students and 40 cadet staff.  Encampment is held in mid- to late-Summer and is targeted for new (typically, first-year) cadets in the program, as well as providing opportunities for advanced cadets seeking management training.  

Additionally, a weekend of training focused on leadership known as the Minnesota Leadership Academy (MLA) is held each October at Camp Ripley for four days.  It is divided into three schools, each specific to the rank and leadership level of the cadets attending.

Emergency Services 
Minnesota Wing operates 19 aircraft (Cessna 172 and Cessna 182 airframes) along with trained ground teams to support operations in Search and Rescue, Disaster Relief, and Homeland Security.

Legal protection
Employers within the borders of Minnesota are required by law to provide employees who are also members of Civil Air Patrol an unpaid leave of absence from employment when these employees are responding to a Civil Air Patrol mission, unless the leave would "unduly disrupt the operations of the employer."

References

External links 
 Minnesota Wing, CAP

Unit links
 130th Composite Squadron Lakeville, MN
 Anoka County Composite Squadron Blaine, MN
 Crookston Composite Squadron Crookston, MN
 Crow Wing Composite Squadron Brainerd, MN
 Duluth Composite Squadron Duluth, MN
 Ft. Snelling Cadet Squadron Minneapolis, MN
 Grand Rapids Composite Squadron Grand Rapids, MN
 Hutchinson Composite Squadron Hutchinson, MN
 Mankato Composite Squadron Mankato, MN
 Minnesota State Legislative Squadron St. Paul, MN
 Northland Composite Squadron Bemidji, MN
 North Hennepin Composite Squadron Crystal, MN
 Owatonna Composite Squadron Owatonna, MN
 Pipestone Senior Squadron Pipestone, MN
 Red Wing Composite Squadron Red Wing, MN
 Southeast MN Composite Squadron Rochester, MN
St. Cloud Composite Squadron St. Cloud, MN
St. Croix Composite Squadron Lake Elmo, MN
 St. Paul Composite Squadron St. Paul, MN
 Tri County Senior Squadron Walker, MN
 Viking Composite Squadron Eden Prairie, MN
 Worthington Composite Squadron Worthington, MN

Wings of the Civil Air Patrol